Tentamun (“she of Amun”) was an ancient Egyptian queen. She is likely to have been the daughter of Ramesses XI, last ruler of the 20th Dynasty. Her mother may have been another Tentamun, who was the mother of Ramesses's other daughter, Duathathor-Henttawy.

In the Story of Wenamun she is mentioned together with a Nesubanebded as residing in Tanis. Both are described as "organizers of the land". From this it is surmised that she was the wife of king Smendes, the first king of the 21st Dynasty.

References

Further reading
 Aidan Dodson & Dyan Hilton: The Complete Royal Families of Ancient Egypt. Thames & Hudson, 2004, pp. 192,209

11th-century BC Egyptian women
People of the Twentieth Dynasty of Egypt
Queens consort of the Twenty-first Dynasty of Egypt
Ramesses XI